Nawazganj is a proposed Lucknow Metro station in Lucknow.

References

Lucknow Metro stations